Ioannis Gelios (born 24 April 1992) is a Greek professional footballer who plays as a goalkeeper for Turkish TFF 1. Lig club Bandırmaspor.

Career
Goalkeeper Ioannis Gelios' patience was put to the test for a long time. He was under contract with the professionals of FC Augsburg for eight years, but did not play a single minute in a competitive game. It was only when he switched to Hansa Rostock that he became a regular goalkeeper.
 He became one of the best goalkeepers in the third division and Holstein Kiel offered him a three years contract in the summer of 2019. He also moved to a higher category, to become a member of the 2.Bundesliga. Out of the 34 matches of the first season, he played in 26. He conceded 42 goals and four times 'kept' his home clean.

Personal life
Gelios hails from Dasochori, Serres.

On 9 April 2021, he tested positive for COVID-19.

Career statistics

References

External links
 Profile at kicker.de

1992 births
People from Irakleia, Serres
Living people
Sportspeople from Augsburg
Footballers from Bavaria
Association football goalkeepers
Greek footballers
Greece under-21 international footballers
German footballers
German people of Greek descent
FC Augsburg players
FC Augsburg II players
FC Hansa Rostock players
Holstein Kiel players
Bandırmaspor footballers
3. Liga players
Regionalliga players
2. Bundesliga players
Greek expatriate footballers
Expatriate footballers in Turkey
Greek expatriate sportspeople in Turkey